Naile İvegin Çırak (born Naile İvegin on May 29, 1985 in Niksar, Tokat Province, Turkey) is a Turkish female basketball player. The  national plays power forward. She currently plays for Antalya 07 Basketbol SK.

Early years 
A basketball player’s daughter, İvegin started basketball in elementary school on the same day as two of her sisters Şaziye and Ayşe. The three sisters played in the Adana-based club Botaşspor.

Career 
After eight years with Botaş, İvegin transferred to Beşiktaş in 2008, where she played two seasons. She returned to her first team Botaş in 2011 after playing two seasons in Tarsus Belediye Spor. In the 2012-13 season, she signed with Homend Antakya Belediye Spor.

She was a member of the national team, which placed 9th at the EuroBasket Women 2009 in Latvia. She won the silver medal with the national team at the EuroBasket Women 2011 in Poland and the bronze medal at the EuroBasket Women 2013 held in France.

Achievements

Club
Botaş
Ronchetti Cup (Euro Cup)
2nd with Botaş: (2) 2000
Turkish Youth Championship
Winners (2): 1999, 2000
Turkish Championship
Winners (1): 2001
Turkish Cup
Winners (2): 2002, 2003
Turkish Presidents Cup
Winners (2): 2002, 2003

See also
 Turkish women in sports

References

1985 births
Living people
People from Niksar
Power forwards (basketball)
Turkish women's basketball players
Botaş SK players
Beşiktaş women's basketball players